Otto III (died 28 September 1057), called the White and known as Otto of Schweinfurt, was the margrave of the Nordgau (1024–1031) and duke of Swabia (1048–1057). He was the son of Henry of Schweinfurt, margrave of the Nordgau, and Gerberga of Henneberg. He was one of the most powerful East Franconian princes by inheritance: having extensive land in the Radenzgau and Schweinfurt. In 1014, he first appears as count of Lower Altmühl (or Kelsgau) and, in 1024, he inherits his father's march. In 1034, he became count of the Lower Naab. From then on to his appointment to Swabia, he takes part in many imperial expeditions into Bohemia, Hungary, and Poland.

At Ulm in January 1048, the Emperor Henry III appointed him duke of Swabia after a  brief vacancy following the death of Otto II. He was loyal to Henry. He was engaged to marry Matilda, daughter of Boleslaus I of Poland, in 1035, but this was put off in favour of a marriage to Immilla, a daughter of Ulric Manfred, Margrave of Turin, as part of Henry's Italian plans. He was otherwise inactive and died after nine years rule and was buried in Schweinfurt.

Family
By his marriage to Immilla (died 29 April 1078), he had:

Bertha or Alberada (died 1 April 1103), married firstly Herman II, Count of Kastl, and married secondly Frederick, Count of Kastl
Gisela, inherited Kulmbach and Plassenburg, married Arnold IV, Count of Andechs
Judith (died 1104), married firstly Conrad I, Duke of Bavaria, and secondly Botho, Count of Pottenstein
Eilika, abbess of Niedermünster
Beatrice (1040–1140), inherited Schweinfurt, married Henry II, Count of Hildrizhausen and Margrave of the Nordgau

Dukes of Swabia
1057 deaths
Year of birth unknown